The following is a list of Singaporean Community Development Councils from 2011 to 2015.

As of 2011, there are still five Community Development Councils throughout Singapore. However, the composition of constituencies within each CDC were changed on 27 May 2011 to reflect the changes in constituencies during the 2011 Singaporean general election.

References 

 Community Development Council